Eugoa brunnea is a moth of the family Erebidae first described by George Hampson in 1914. It is found in China and Taiwan.

References

Moths described in 1914
brunnea